La Salle Township may refer to the following places in the United States:

 LaSalle Township, LaSalle County, Illinois
 La Salle Township, Michigan

Township name disambiguation pages